The 2004 Sun Belt Conference football season was an NCAA football season that was played from August 28, 2004, to January 6, 2005.

References